Giffnock Newton Mearns Synagogue, commonly known as Giffnock Shul, located at 222 Fenwick Road in Giffnock, East Renfrewshire (on the south side of Glasgow), is the largest Orthodox Jewish congregation in Scotland. The synagogue also features a religious day school for both children and teenagers.

Spiritual leadership

The congregation is led by Rabbi Moshe Rubin who hails from the United States and joined the community in 1990, first serving as their cantor. He was asked to take over the pulpit in 1999, after the retirement of the Rabbi Philip Greenberg, who retired in 1998. Giffnock's cantor from 1964 to 1990 (then emeritus cantor) was Rev Ernest Levy OBE (d. August 2009). The cantor for the high holy days since 2008 has been Mr. Russell Grossman, of London.

Brief history and community
Founded in about 1934, the synagogue stood at May Terrace in Giffnock until 1968. The current complex was erected on Maryville Avenue. Giffnock Synagogue is described as a "provincial synagogue". As an affiliate member of the United Synagogue organization of UK, it is under the aegis of the Chief Rabbi. It is the largest Jewish community in Scotland. Services are conducted in the Ashkenazi Orthodox ritual.

Membership
1938 – 350 seatholders (Jewish Year Book 1939)
1950 – 400 seatholders (Jewish Year Book 1951)
1953 – 550 seatholders (Jewish Year Book 1954)
1957 – 750 seatholders (Jewish Year Book 1958)
2007 – 700 seatholders (approximation)

See also
History of the Jews in Scotland
Garnethill Synagogue
Synagogues
Synagogue architecture
Judaism
Modern Orthodox Judaism
Ashkenazi Jews

References

External links
 
 The Virtual Jewish History Tour – Scotland
 Jewish Encyclopedia on Scotland
 Scottish Jewish Archives Centre
 Giffnock & Newlands Synagogue on Jewish Communities and Records – UK (hosted by jewishgen.org).

Buildings and structures in East Renfrewshire
Giffnock
Jewish organizations established in 1934
Modern Orthodox Judaism in Europe
Modern Orthodox synagogues
Orthodox synagogues in the United Kingdom
Religion in East Renfrewshire
Synagogues in Glasgow
1930s establishments in Scotland